The Seiyu Award for Best Rookie Actress is one of the awards at the Seiyu Awards.

Winners

References

Seiyu Awards
Awards for actresses